Manno Wolf-Ferrari (5 September 1911 – 17 April 1994) was an Italian conductor, nephew of composer Ermanno Wolf-Ferrari.

He studied in Venice and Siena, and quickly established himself as a leading conductor of the Italian opera repertory, which he performed widely in Italy but also abroad, notably in Monte-Carlo, London, Madrid, etc. He can be heard on disc in Il matrimonio segreto, with Alda Noni, Giulietta Simionato, Cesare Valletti, and Sesto Bruscantini and in I Lombardi alla prima crociata with Maria Vitale and Gustavo Gallo.

Sources
Le guide de l'opéra, Roland Mancini & Jean-Jacques Rouveroux, (Fayard, 1996),

References

Italian male conductors (music)
Musicians from Venice
1911 births
1994 deaths
20th-century Italian conductors (music)
20th-century Italian male musicians